Government House, also known as the Governor's Mansion, is the official residence of the governor of Maryland. It is located on State Circle in Annapolis, Maryland, adjacent to the Maryland State House complex.   The residence has been the home of the Governor since 1870; before that, from 1777 until 1870, Jennings House was the residence of the governors of Maryland.

Government House was designed by Baltimore architect R. Snowden Andrews (1830–1903). Originally designed in the fashion of the time, with a Mansard roof and Italianate arched windows. the residence was converted in 1935–36 to its present Georgian style.

Gallery

References

External links 
Government House webpage
Tour information

Maryland
History of Maryland
Houses in Annapolis, Maryland
Museums in Annapolis, Maryland
Historic house museums in Maryland
Government buildings in Maryland
1870 establishments in Maryland
Governor of Maryland